Rhinacanthus scoparius is a species of plant in the family Acanthaceae. It is endemic to Yemen.  Its natural habitats are subtropical or tropical dry shrubland and subtropical or tropical dry lowland grassland.

References

Endemic flora of Socotra
scoparius
Least concern plants
Taxonomy articles created by Polbot
Taxa named by Isaac Bayley Balfour